Free Will is a ghost town in Bloom Township, Osborne County, Kansas, United States.

History
Free Will was never a ghost town by any stretch of the imagination, but it was a rural post office in a farmhouse - nothing more. The Free Will post office opened in 1872. The post office was discontinued in 1895.  There is nothing left of Free Will.

References

Former populated places in Osborne County, Kansas
Former populated places in Kansas